Inocencia Alcubierre Rodríguez, also known as Ino Alcubierre (16 June 1901 – 1927) was a Spanish actress.

Biography 
Alcubierre was born in Uncastillo in 1901 and moved to Barcelona during her childhood with her parents. As a teenager, she worked as an usher in a movie theater.

In 1921, she received the lead role in her first film, a western called, Lilian. She acted for director , as Doña Inés in the production of Don Juan Tenorio in 1922. Alcubierre took a three-year hiatus to care for her baby daughter. After appearing in a film that had no significant impact in 1925, she appeared in Nobleza baturra, which went on to become one of the most successful silent films in Spain, however, no copy of the film survived. Her performance as María del Pilar, a "representation of the pain and heart heat" was praised. In 1926, she played a role in La malcasada, which discussed the then-controversial subject of divorce.

Alcubierre died in a traffic accident in Madrid.

Filmography 
 1921: Lilian
 1922: Don Juan tenorio
 1925: Nobleza baturra
 1926: La malcasada

References

External links 
 
 
 

1901 births
1927 deaths
Spanish actresses
Spanish silent film actresses